Yannick Zambernardi (born 3 September 1977) is a French former professional footballer. During his career, Zambernardi played for French clubs SC Bastia, Gazélec Ajaccio, AC Ajaccio, Troyes and FC Istres, as well as Hibernian and Dunfermline Athletic in Scotland, and La Louvière in Belgium.

Career
Born in Ajaccio, France, Zambernardi started his career with Ligue 1 side Bastia in 1997 but failed to make any appearances. He then moved to his hometown Ajaccio, firstly playing for Gazélec Ajaccio and then AC Ajaccio. From there he moved to Troyes.

Zambernardi attracted attention from Hibernian manager Bobby Williamson. He was signed in August 2002, playing 35 league games before leaving to join Belgian side La Louvière in June 2004. After spending one season in Belgium, Zambernardi returned to Scotland this time to play for Dunfermline Athletic. He made his debut against Celtic in August 2005 but after 15 league games, was released at the end of the season. He then signed for French side FC Istres, playing only five games before being released.

Honours
Troyes AC
UEFA Intertoto Cup: 2001

References

External links
 
 

1977 births
Living people
Association football defenders
French footballers
French expatriate footballers
SC Bastia players
AC Ajaccio players
ES Troyes AC players
Hibernian F.C. players
R.A.A. Louviéroise players
Dunfermline Athletic F.C. players
FC Istres players
Ligue 1 players
Ligue 2 players
Scottish Premier League players
Expatriate footballers in Scotland
Expatriate footballers in Belgium
Footballers from Corsica